Martin Freyer (born 4 October 1995 in Harare) is a Zimbabwean-born Namibian cyclist. In February 2018, he won the Namibian National Road Race Championships.

Major results

2013
 National Junior Road Championships
1st  Road race
1st  Time trial
 3rd Nedbank Cycle Classic
2015
 National Road Championships
1st  Under-23 road race
1st  Under-23 time trial
2nd Road race
3rd Time trial
 2nd Nedbank Cycle Classic
2017
 National Road Championships
1st  Under-23 road race
1st  Under-23 time trial
2nd Time trial
2018
 National Road Championships
1st  Road race
2nd Time trial

References

External links

1995 births
Living people
Namibian male cyclists
Sportspeople from Harare
Cyclists at the 2018 Commonwealth Games
Commonwealth Games competitors for Namibia
White Namibian people